The Arcadia 2001 is a second-generation 8-bit home video game console released by Emerson Radio in May 1982 for a price of US$ 99, several months before the release of ColecoVision. It was discontinued only 18 months later, with a total of 35 games having been released. Emerson licensed the Arcadia 2001 to Bandai, which released it in Japan. Over 30 Arcadia 2001 clones exist.

The unrelated Arcadia Corporation, manufacturer of the Atari 2600 Supercharger add-on, was sued by Emerson for trademark infringement. Arcadia Corporation then changed its name to Starpath.

Description
The Arcadia is much smaller than its contemporary competitors and is powered by a standard 12 volt power supply so it can be used in a boat or a vehicle. It has two headphone jacks on the far left and right sides of the back.

The system came with two Intellivision-style controllers with a 12-button keypad and "fire" buttons on the sides. The direction pads have a removable joystick attachment. Most games came with BoPET overlays that can be applied to the controller's keypads. The console itself has five buttons: Power, Start, Reset, Option, and Select.

There are at least three different cartridge case styles and artwork, with variations on each. Emerson-family cartridges come in two different lengths (short and long) of black plastic cases.

Technical specifications

Main Processor: Signetics 2650 CPU (some variants run a Signetics 2650A)
RAM: 1 KB
ROM: None
Video display: 128 × 208 / 128 × 104, 8 Colours
Video display controller: Signetics 2637 UVI @ 3.58 MHz (NTSC), 3.55 MHz (PAL)
Sound: Single Channel "Beeper" + Single Channel "Noise"
Hardware Sprites: 4 independent, single color
Controllers: 2 × 2 way
Keypads: 2 × 12 button (more buttons on some variants)

Console variants and clones
Many variants and clones of the Arcadia 2001 have been released by various companies in different countries. These systems are mostly compatible with each other. In 1982, the Bandai Arcadia was released only in Japan. Four exclusive games were released for the system.

Bandai Arcadia

In 1982, the Bandai Arcadia, a variant of the Emerson Arcadia 2001, was licensed and distributed to Japan by Bandai for a price of 19,800 yen. There were four Japan-exclusive games released by Bandai.

Doraemon
Dr. Slump
Mobile Suit Gundam
Super Dimension Fortress Macross

Reception

After seeing the Arcadia 2001 at the summer 1982 Consumer Electronics Show, Danny Goodman of Creative Computing Video & Arcade Games reported that its graphics were similar to the Atari 2600's, and that "our overall impression of the game play was favorable for a system in this price range, though no cartridge stands out as being an exciting original creation". He called the controller offering both Intellivision-like disc and joystick functionality "A great idea".

Games
Emerson planned to launch the console with 19 games. Some Arcadia 2001 games are ports of lesser-known arcade games such as Route 16, Jungler, and Jump Bug, which were not available on other home systems.

Emerson actually created many popular arcade titles including Pac-Man, Galaxian and Defender for the Arcadia, but never had them manufactured as Atari started to sue its competitor companies for releasing games to which it had exclusive-rights agreements. Early marketing showed popular arcade games, but they were later released as clones. For instance, the Arcadia 2001 game Space Raiders is a clone of Defender, and Breakaway is a clone of Breakout.

Released games 
There are 47 games known to have been released for the Arcadia 2001 and its clones.

Unreleased games

References

External links

 Video Game Console Library entry on the Arcadia 2001
 TheGameConsole.com entry on the Arcadia 2001
 The Dot Eaters entry on the Arcadia 2001
 www.old-computers.com Emerson Arcadia 2001 museum entry
 www.old-computers.com Article about Arcadia 2001 and clones
 Arcadia 2001 retrospective at IGN

Home video game consoles
Second-generation video game consoles
Bandai consoles
Products introduced in 1982
Products and services discontinued in 1984
1980s toys